Banović Strahinja (Serbian Cyrillic: Бановић Страхиња, released internationally as The Falcon) is a 1981 Yugoslavian-German adventure film written and directed by Vatroslav Mimica based on Strahinja Banović, a hero of Serbian epic poetry. It entered the section "Officina Veneziana" at the 38th Venice International Film Festival.

Plot
During the late 14th century Serbia becomes the target of the Ottoman Empire. The year is 1388 and Turkish bandits freely roam throughout southern Serbia. While the majority of Serbian knights is concentrated around the city of Kruševac, capital of Serbia at the time, the southern borders are partially left undefended.  It is not until the following year of 1389 when it will come to a total clash of two armies.   

While the respected Serbian noble Strahinja Banović is out hunting, a Turkish renegade gang burns his castle, kills all of his servants, and takes the young wife of Banović Strahinja. Strahinja begins a long quest to rescue his wife despite everybody else's doubts in her fidelity. Strahinja gathers a posse of scoundrels and goes after the bandits. In the meantime, the Turkish bandit Alija tries to seduce Strahinja's wife Anđa, but she refuses him. However, over a period of time she begins to weaken.

Cast
 Franco Nero as Banović Strahinja
 Gert Fröbe as Jug Bogdan
 Dragan Nikolić as Alija
 Sanja Vejnović as	Anđa
 Rade Šerbedžija as Abdulah
 Kole Angelovski as Timotije
 Stole Aranđelović	as Pop Gradislav
 Neda Spasojević as Luda
 Janez Vrhovec as Vladika
 Rados Bajic as Boško Jugović

References

External links
 

1981 films
1980s action adventure films
Films set in the 14th century
Films directed by Vatroslav Mimica
Films shot in Croatia
Films set in Serbia
Films set in the Ottoman Empire
1980s biographical films
German action adventure films
Yugoslav action adventure films
Films shot in Serbia
Serbo-Croatian-language films
1980s German films